Juan Errazquin Tomás (22 June 1906 — 13 January 1931) was a Spanish footballer who played as a forward.

Club career
Born in Leones, Argentina to Basque parents, Errazquin moved to the Basque town of Irun as a child. In 1921, Errazquin made his debut for Real Unión B, at the age of 15, before working his way up to Real Unión's first team by 1923, starting in Real Unión's 1924 Copa del Rey Final win at the age of 17.

International career
On 1 June 1925, Errazquin made his debut for Spain in a 3–0 win against Switzerland, scoring all three goals. At the age of 18 and 344 days, Errazquin became the youngest goalscorer in Spain's history, until Ansu Fati's goal against Ukraine on 6 September 2020 at the age of 17 years and 311 days broke Errazquin's 95-year-old record.

International goals
Scores and results list Spain's goal tally first.

Death
On 6 January 1931, Errazquin died at the age of 24 following, what Mundo Deportivo described as, a "cruel disease".

References

External links

1906 births
1931 deaths
Sportspeople from Córdoba Province, Argentina
Spanish footballers
Spain international footballers
Argentine footballers
Argentine people of Basque descent
Association football forwards
Real Unión footballers
Argentine emigrants to Spain
Sportspeople from Irun
Footballers from the Basque Country (autonomous community)